Charming may refer to:

Fiction
 Charming (film), a computer-animated musical comedy film
 Charming (Sons of Anarchy), a fictional town where the television series Sons of Anarchy is set
 Prince Charming (disambiguation), a stock fairy tale character
 The Charmings, an American fantasy sitcom (1987-1988)
 "Charming", a song from the musical Natasha, Pierre & the Great Comet of 1812

Other uses
 Charming (constituency), a constituency in Yau Tsim Mong District, Hong Kong
 Buddleja davidii 'Charming', an American cultivar

See also
 Charm (disambiguation)
 Charmed (disambiguation)
 Charmer (disambiguation)